The trabucco ( or trabocco; in some southern dialects called travocc) is an old fishing machine typical of the coast of  Abruzzi region (specially in the Trabocchi Coast or Costa dei Trabocchi) and also in the coast of Gargano, where they are protected as historical monuments in the Gargano National Park. Trabucchi are spread along the coast of the southern Adriatic, especially in the Italian provinces of Chieti, Campobasso, and Foggia, and also in some parts of the coast of the southern Tyrrhenian Sea.

Construction features 

A trabucco is a massive construction built from wood consisting of a platform anchored to the rock by large logs of Aleppo pine, jutting out into the sea. From this platform, two (or more) long arms called antennae stretch out suspended some feet above the water, supporting a huge, narrow-meshed, net (called trabocchetto).

The morphology of the Gargano coast and of Abruzzo determined the presence of two different types of trabucco: the Garganic trabucco is usually anchored to a rocky platform, longitudinally extended to the coastline, from which the antennae depart.
The variant of Abruzzo and Molise, also called bilancia, are often found on shallower coasts and therefore is characterized by the presence of a platform, transversal to the coast, which is connected by a tight bridge made of wooden boards. A bilancia has just one winch, often electrically operating, even when the sea is perfectly calm. Abruzzo bilancia also have a much smaller net than that of the Gargano trabucco. Another feature that differentiates the two types is the length and number of antennae, with more extensive antennae found in Gargano (double that of Abruzzo and Molise) in Termoli balances were more than two antennae, Gargano always two or more.

History 

According with some historians of Apulia, the trabucco was invented in the region imported from Phoenicians. However, the earliest documented existence in Gargano dates back to 18th century, during which Gargano fishermen, during that period sparsely populated, devised an ingenious technique of fishing that wasn't subject to weather conditions in the area. Trabucchi were built in the most prominent promontories, jutting nets out to sea through a system of monumental wooden arms. The development of the trabucchi allowed fishing without being submitted to sea conditions using the morphology of the rocky coast of Gargano.

The trabucco is built with traditional wood Aleppo pine -the typical pine of Gargano and common throughout the South-Western Adriatic- because this material is widely available in the region, modeled, elastic, weatherproof and resistant to salt (trabucco must resist to strong winds of Provence usually blowing in these areas). Some trabucchi have been rebuilt in recent years, thanks to public funds. However, since they lost their economic function in the past centuries when they were the main economical source of entire families of fishermen, trabucchi rose into the role of cultural and architectural symbols and tourist attraction.

Fishing system 

The fishing technique, quite efficacious, is "on sight". It consists of intercepting, with wide nets, the flows of fish moving along the ravines of the coast. Trabucchi are located where the sea is deep enough (at least 6 meters), and are built on rocky peaks generally oriented southeast or north in order to exploit the favorable marine current.

The net is lowered into the water through a complex system of winches and, likewise, promptly pulled up to retrieve its catch. At least two men are entrusted with the tough task of operating the winches that maneuver the giant net. Small trabucchi of Abruzzo and Molise Coast are often electrically powered.

The trabucco is managed at least by four fishermen called trabuccolanti who share the duties of watching the fish and maneuvering.

Distribution 

The trabucchi are a distinguishing feature of the coastal landscape of the lower Adriatic. Their presence is also attested on the lower Tyrrhenian Sea.

Trabucchi are spread throughout the Trabocchi Coast in the Abruzzi region where they are called travocchi (in dialect of Molise and Abruzzo) in the province of Campobasso, Termoli, Chieti and south of Ortona and in the Gargano coast, but are more widely present in the area between Peschici and Vieste (where there isn't any promontory without one of these giant structures). The ancient trabucchi are protected by the National Park of Gargano, which adopted them as a sign of respect for tradition and environment of the Gargano, as a symbol of civilization, are now a favorite subject of artists and craftsmen.

Costa dei Trabocchi 

The Trabocchi Coast (Costa dei Trabocchi) is a stretch of coast province of Chieti, which includes the countries situated between Francavilla al Mare and Vasto. The coast is full of quaint fishing overflow, some of which have been converted into restaurants. The coast is also known for the presence of the so-called " Dannunzio's hermitage" (promontorio dannunziano), where stands the villa that the poet Gabriele d'Annunzio used with his mistress for the writing of his novel Trionfo della morte.

The cities of the coast are:

Casalbordino
Fossacesia
Francavilla al Mare
Ortona
Rocca San Giovanni
San Salvo
San Vito Chietino
Torino di Sangro
Vasto

See also

 Chinese fishing nets
Trabucco's area of diffusion
 Gargano
 Peschici
 Rodi Garganico
 San Menaio
 Vico del Gargano
 Vieste

Area of diffusion of Trabocco or Bilancia variants

 Ortona
 San Vito Chietino
 Termoli
 Vasto

Notes

References 
 Paula Hardy, Abigail Hole, Olivia Pozzan, Puglia & Basilicata, 2008, page 93
 P. Barone, L. Marino, O. Pignatelli, I Trabocchi, Macchine da pesca della costa adriatica, CIERRE edizioni, 1999 
 M. Fasanella, G. De Nittis, Il Trabucco, Vieste FG, Grafiche Laconeta, 1992 
 Pietro Cupido, Trabocchi, Traboccanti e Briganti, Ortona CH, Edizioni Menabò, Libreria D'Abruzzo
 Teresa Maria Rauzino, Rita Lombardi, Raffaella Specchiulli, Ignazio Polignone, I trabucchi della costa garganica

External link

Apulia
Fishing techniques and methods
Marine architecture
Coastal construction